Taipu is a municipality (município) in the Brazilian state of Rio Grande do Norte. As of 2020, IBGE estimated a population of 12,297  inhabitants. The municipality covers a total area of 353 km².

References

Municipalities in Rio Grande do Norte